The year 1910 in science and technology involved some significant events, listed below.

Astronomy
 May 18 – Earth passes through the tail of Halley's Comet.
 Approximate date – The Hertzsprung–Russell diagram is developed by Ejnar Hertzsprung and Henry Norris Russell.

Cartography
 Behrmann projection introduced.

Chemistry
 Albert Einstein and Marian Smoluchowski find the Einstein-Smoluchowski formula for the attenuation coefficient due to density fluctuations in a gas.
 Umetaro Suzuki isolates the first vitamin complex, aberic acid.
 Hoechst AG market Arsphenamine under the trade name Salvarsan, the first organic antisyphilitic, its properties having been discovered the previous fall by bacteriologist Sahachiro Hata during systematic testing in the laboratory of Paul Ehrlich; it rapidly becomes the world's most widely prescribed drug.
 George Barger and James Ewens of Wellcome Laboratories in London first synthesize dopamine.

Mathematics
 Publication of the 1st volume of Principia Mathematica by Alfred North Whitehead and Bertrand Russell, one of the most important and seminal works in mathematical logic and philosophy.
 First known use of the term "Econometrics" (in cognate form), by Paweł Ciompa.

Physics
 German physicist Theodor Wulf climbs the Eiffel Tower with an electrometer and discovers the first evidence of cosmic rays.
 Hans Reissner and Gunnar Nordström define the Reissner-Nordström singularity; Hermann Weyl solves the special case for a point-body source.

Physiology and medicine
 March – International Psychoanalytical Association established.
 May 18 – At the annual meeting of the American Association for the Study of the Feeble-Minded, Henry H. Goddard introduces a system for classifying individuals with mental retardation based on intelligence quotient (IQ): moron for those with an IQ of 51–70, imbecile for those with an IQ of 26–50, and idiot for those with an IQ of 0-25.
 July 15 – Publication of the eighth edition of Emil Kraepelin's Psychiatrie: Ein Lehrbuch für Studierende und Arzte, naming Alzheimer's disease as a variety of dementia.
 Late December – A form of pneumonic plague spreads through northeastern China, killing more than 40,000.
 Thomas Hunt Morgan discovers that genes are located on chromosomes.
 Chicago cardiologist James B. Herrick makes the first published identification of sickle cells in the blood of a patient with anemia.
 Platelets are first named by James Homer Wright.
 Peyton Rous demonstrates that a malignant tumor can be transmitted by a virus (which becomes known as the Rous sarcoma virus, a retrovirus).
 Hans Christian Jacobaeus of Sweden performs the first thoracoscopic diagnosis with a cystoscope.

Technology
 January 12–13 –  Lee De Forest conducts an experimental broadcast of part of a live performance of Tosca and, the next day, a performance with the participation of the Italian tenor Enrico Caruso from the stage of Metropolitan Opera House in New York City.
 March 28 – Henri Fabre makes the first flights in a seaplane, at Martigues, France.
 June 7 – William G. Allen of the Allen Manufacturing Company is granted a United States patent for a hex key.
 October – First publication of infrared photographs, by American optical physicist Robert W. Wood in the Royal Photographic Society's Journal.
 December 3–18 – Georges Claude demonstrates the first modern neon light at the Paris Motor Show.
 Lieutenant-Colonel Dr. George Owen Squier of the United States Army invents telephone carrier multiplexing.
 Completion of Delaware, Lackawanna and Western Railroad's Paulinskill Viaduct on its Lackawanna Cut-Off, the world's largest reinforced concrete structure at this time, built under the supervision of Lincoln Bush, its chief engineer.

Institutions
 March 17 – The Smithsonian Institution's Natural History Building, later the National Museum of Natural History, opens its doors to the public in Washington, D.C.

Awards
 Nobel Prizes
 Physics – Johannes Diderik van der Waals
 Chemistry – Otto Wallach
 Medicine – Albrecht Kossel

Births
 January 20 – Friederike Victoria Gessner, later Joy Adamson (murdered 1980), Austrian-born wildlife conservationist.
 February 9 – Jacques Monod (died 1976), French biochemist, winner of Nobel Prize in Physiology or Medicine in 1965.
 February 13 – William Shockley (died 1989), American physicist.
 March 11 – Robert Havemann (died 1982), German chemist.
 May 3 – Helen M. Duncan (died 1971), American geologist and paleontologist
 May 12 – Dorothy Hodgkin (died 1994), British chemist.
 June 11 – Jacques Cousteau (died 1997), French oceanographer.
 July 16 – David Lack (died 1973), English ornithologist.
 August 18 – Pál Turán (died 1976), Hungarian mathematician.
 August 28 – C. Doris Hellman (died 1973), American historian of science.
 September 1 – Pierre Bézier (died 1999), French engineer.
 October 11 – Cahit Arf (died 1997), Turkish mathematician.
 October 27 – Margaret Hutchinson Rousseau (died 2000), American chemical engineer.
 October 31 – Victor Rothschild (died 1990), British polymath.
 December 24 – Bill Pickering (died 2004), New Zealand-born head of NASA's Jet Propulsion Laboratory.

Deaths
 May 10 – Stanislao Cannizzaro (born 1826), Italian chemist.
 May 12 – William Huggins (born 1824), English astronomer.
 May 27 – Robert Koch (born 1843), German bacteriologist.
 July 4 – Giovanni Schiaparelli (born 1835), Italian astronomer.
 July 14 – Mihran Kassabian (born 1870), American radiologist.
 August 12 – Florence Nightingale (born 1820), English nurse.

References

 
20th century in science
1910s in science